James Keene was the pseudonym used by William Everett Cook to write western novels. After his death other authors including Ida Cook used the name.

Bibliography

Single titles
The Texas Pistol (1955)
The Brass and the Blue (1956)
Justice, My Brother! (1957)
Seven for Vengeance (1958)
McCracken in Command (1959)
The Posse from Gunlock (1959)
Gunman's Harvest (1960)
Iron Man, Iron Horse (1960)
Sixgun Wild (1960)
Gunnison's Empire (1963)
Broken Gun (1964)
The Horse Trader (1964)

References and sources

Collective pseudonyms